Thenmozhi Soundararajan is a Dalit rights activist based in the United States of America. She is also a transmedia storyteller, songwriter, hip hop musician and technologist. She has been actively campaigning for the rights of the marginalized in midst of structural casteism.

Personal life 
Soundararajan's parents are from a village in rural India where they experienced inter-caste violence. Her father is a doctor and her mother is the first woman from her family to get a college education. In the fifth grade, after reading about the effects of the Bhopal disaster on the Untouchables, she learned from her mother that she is a Dalit.

Soundararajan publicly revealed that she is a Dalit when she made a documentary film on caste and violence against women as a part of her college thesis at the University of California, Berkeley. For Soundararajan, this decision had many consequences: while fellow Dalits secretly confided in her about their identity, she has also stated that she faced discrimination from almost all of the Indian professors in her campus and that they refused to advise her on projects.

Professional life 
Soundararajan is a filmmaker, transmedia artist and storyteller. Currently, she is the Executive Director of Equality Labs, an Ambedkarite South Asian progressive power-building organization that uses community research, cultural and political organizing, popular education and digital security to fight the oppressions of caste apartheid, Islamophobia, white supremacy, and religious intolerance. She was also the executive director of Third World Majority, a woman of color media and technology justice training and organizing institution based in Oakland, California. She is also a co-founder of the Media Justice Network, and Third World Majority is one of the network’s national anchor organizations. In that context she has worked with over 300 community organizations across the United States.

Soundararajan has used storytelling to speak about casteism within the Indian diaspora. She has worked with bassist Marvin Etizioni on her debut blues album, Broken People, which was a collection of liberation songs about people belonging to the Black and Dalit community. Her essay and a photo series about her Dalit experience in the United States was published in Outlook magazine.

In 2015, the Robert Rauschenberg Foundation included her in their first group of Artist as Activist fellows. She has used this fellowship to work on #DalitWomenFight, a transmedia project and activist movement.

Soundararajan has been involved in the curation and creation of Dalit History Month, a radical history project. Its goal is to share Dalit historians' research, which is a deviation from many scholarly projects which have studied Dalit history without leadership or collaboration from Dalits.

In 2020, Soundararajan began hosting the podcast, "Caste in the USA", in which she explores caste discrimination at American campuses, offices, and households, through conversations with individuals who have first-hand experience with casteism in America.

Soundarajan's advocacy group, Equality Labs told the Washington Post that more than 250 tech workers had come forward in the wake of the Cisco suit   to report incidents of caste-based harassment.

In April 2022, Soundarajan was scheduled to give a talk at Google for Dalit History Month but it was canceled after she was accused of being “Hindu-phobic” and “anti-Hindu”".

Works 
 The Trauma of Caste, North Atlantic Books, 2022.

References

Further reading 
 Soundararajan, Thenmozhi; Varatharajah, Sinthujan. Caste Privilege 101: A Primer for the Privileged, The Aerogram, 2015. 
 Soundararajan, Thenmozhi. I'm A Proud Dalit-American And This Is Why I Marched, Huffington Post, 2017. 
 Gaikwad, Rahi. An equal music, The Hindu, 2016.
 Hirahara, Naomi (2022). We are Here

External links

 Caste in the USA, audacy, 2020.

Year of birth missing (living people)
Living people
University of California, Berkeley alumni
American artists
American hip hop musicians
American women songwriters
Dalit activists